Fernando Tinajero Villamar (born 1940, Quito) is an Ecuadorian novelist, essayist, and university professor. In the 1960s, he was one of the most active members of Tzantzismo a cultural vanguard movement which had roots in the Cuban revolution. He was the 2015 recipient of the Eugenio Espejo Prize in literature awarded by the Ecuadorian president.

Works
 "Más allá de los dogmas" (1967) with foreword by Benjamín Carrión
 "El desencuentro"
 "Aproximaciones y distancias: ensayos"
 "Teoría de la cultura nacional"
 "De la evasión al desencanto"

References

1940 births
Living people
Ecuadorian novelists
Ecuadorian essayists
People from Quito